Wattsville is an unincorporated community in Laurens County, South Carolina, United States. The town name is derived from Watts Mill, a textile mill in the center of town. The area is listed as the Wattsville census-designated place (CDP) for statistical purposes. The population of the CDP was 1,635 at the 2010 census. It is part of the Greenville–Mauldin–Easley Metropolitan Statistical Area.

Geography
U.S. Route 221 passes through the center of Wattsville, leading north  to Spartanburg and south through Laurens  to Greenwood. South Carolina Highway 49 leaves US 221 in Wattsville, leading northeast  to Union.

The center of the community occupies a ridge between south-flowing streams that lead to the Little River, a southeast-flowing tributary of the Saluda River.

Demographics

As of the census of 2010, there were 1,635 people, 564 households, and 356 families residing in the CDP. The population density was 646.8 people per square mile (249.4/km2). There were 629 housing units at an average density of 275.1/sq mi (106.1/km2). The racial makeup of the CDP was 68.29% White, 16.23% African American, 2.77% Native American, 0.20% Pacific Islander, 9.33% from other races, and 3.18% from two or more races. Hispanic or Latino of any race were 16.36% of the population.

There were 566 households, out of which 32.7% had children under the age of 18 living with them, 41.2% were married couples living together, 14.7% had a female householder with no husband present, and 37.1% were non-families. 30.2% of all households were made up of individuals, and 12.5% had someone living alone who was 65 years of age or older. The average household size was 2.61 and the average family size was 3.21.

In the CDP, the population was spread out, with 26.4% under the age of 18, 12.5% from 18 to 24, 29.6% from 25 to 44, 20.8% from 45 to 64, and 10.8% who were 65 years of age or older. The median age was 31 years. For every 100 females, there were 110.7 males. For every 100 females age 18 and over, there were 102.4 males.

The median income for a household in the CDP was $25,046, and the median income for a family was $26,328. Males had a median income of $26,473 versus $15,833 for females. The per capita income for the CDP was $12,555. About 22.5% of families and 25.3% of the population were below the poverty line, including 39.5% of those under age 18 and 15.1% of those age 65 or over.

References

Census-designated places in Laurens County, South Carolina
Census-designated places in South Carolina
Upstate South Carolina